Salvador Volpati is a Portuguese former footballer who played as a defender.

Career 
Volpati played in the National Soccer League in 1971 with Toronto First Portuguese. In July, 1971 he was loaned to the Toronto Metros of the North American Soccer League because of a player shortage due to inquires. He made two appearances for the Metros during his short stint.

References  
 

 
Year of birth missing
Association football defenders
Portuguese footballers
Toronto First Portuguese players
Toronto Blizzard (1971–1984) players
Canadian National Soccer League players
North American Soccer League (1968–1984) players
Portuguese expatriate footballers
Expatriate soccer players in Canada
Portuguese expatriate sportspeople in Canada